Levi Asher Cadogan (born 8 November 1995) is a Barbadian athlete specialising in the sprinting events. He won the silver medal at the 2014 Central American and Caribbean Games and finished fourth at the 2014 World Junior Championships.

Personal best

Competition record

References

1995 births
Living people
Barbadian male sprinters
Athletes (track and field) at the 2015 Pan American Games
Pan American Games competitors for Barbados
World Athletics Championships athletes for Barbados
Athletes (track and field) at the 2016 Summer Olympics
Olympic athletes of Barbados
Central American and Caribbean Games silver medalists for Barbados
Competitors at the 2014 Central American and Caribbean Games
Central American and Caribbean Games medalists in athletics